Ningjin may refer to the following places in China:

Ningjin County, Hebei (宁晋县)
Ningjin County, Shandong (宁津县)
Ningjin Town (宁津镇), town in and seat of Ningjin County, Shandong